Rodriguan may refer to:

 Anything of, from, or related to Rodrigues, an island which is part of Mauritius located 5608 km (3488 mi) east of Mauritius island
 A person from Rodrigues, or of Rodriguan descent. For information on Rodriguan people, see Demographics of Rodrigues and Culture of Rodrigues. For specific persons, see List of Rodriguans.
 Note that there is no language called "Rodriguan". The most widely spoken languages are English (official) and French. See also Rodriguan creole the country's native language.

See also